East Haven or Easthaven may refer to:

Places
East Haven, Angus, Scotland
East Haven, Connecticut, United States
East Haven, Indiana, United States
East Haven, Vermont, United States

Games
Easthaven (card game), a variant of the patience or solitaire known as Westcliff
Easthaven, a place in the role-playing video game Icewind Dale

See also 
 Haven (disambiguation)
 New Haven (disambiguation)
 West Haven (disambiguation)
 North Haven (disambiguation)
 South Haven (disambiguation)